The Fokker 50 is a turboprop-powered airliner, designed as an improved version of the successful Fokker F27 Friendship. The Fokker 60 is a stretched freighter version of the Fokker 50. Both aircraft were manufactured and supported by Dutch aircraft manufacturer Fokker.

The Fokker 50 was developed during the early 1980s following a decline in the sales of the company's earlier F27 Friendship. It was decided that the new airliner would be a derivative of its predecessor, sharing much of its airframe and design features, while incorporating new advances and several improvements, such as the adoption of Pratt & Whitney Canada PW127B turboprop engines, in order to produce a successor that had a 30 per cent reduction in fuel consumption over the F27.

The Fokker 50 performed its maiden flight on 28 December 1985, and entered revenue service during 1987. The Fokker 60 has been operated by the Royal Netherlands Air Force (RNLAF), ex-RNLAF aircraft are also in service with the Peruvian Naval Aviation and the Republic of China's Air Force.

Development

Fokker 50
By the early 1980s, the Dutch aircraft manufacturer Fokker, who had identified that sales of the Fokker F27 Friendship, a turboprop-powered airliner which had been in continual production since 1958, were beginning to decline. Accordingly, the company decided to conduct a series of design studies for follow-up products to the key elements of their existing product line, these being the centered around the F27 and the Fokker F28 Fellowship jet airliner. In November 1983, Fokker decided to commence simultaneous work on two development projects to develop a pair of new airliners - these being the Fokker 100, which was to succeed the F28, and the Fokker 50, which was the successor to the F27. The Fokker 50 programme suffered some delays, leading to the first aircraft being delivered more than a year following the final F27 delivery.

The Fokker 50 was basically an amalgamation of various refinements and improvements which had been made to the design of the F27 Friendship. As a result of these modifications, such as the adoption of Pratt & Whitney Canada PW127B turboprop engines, Fokker was able to progressively reduce the F27's fuel consumption by 30 per cent. Various different propeller designs were adopted over timespan of the aircraft's production, while an increasing proportion of composite materials were used in the airframe, adjustments to the wing design, and a higher degree of cockpit automation were areas of major advances of the Fokker 50 over its predecessor.

Fokker partnered with several companies to manufacture portions of the Fokker 50; these included the wing being produced by Belgian aerospace firm SABCA, fuselage sections made by French aircraft manufacturer Dassault Aviation, flaps and other components manufactured by German aerospace company Messerschmitt-Bölkow-Blohm (MBB), and vertical stabilizers and horizontal stabilizers built by Japanese multinational corporation Fuji Heavy Industries. A pair of prototypes, derived from F27 airframes, were produced; on 28 December 1985, the first of these prototypes performed its maiden flight. In 1987, certification of the Fokker 50 by the Dutch aviation authority RLD was successfully completed, and the first production aircraft was subsequently delivered to German airline DLT Luftverkehrsgesellschaft (DLT). DLT and Ansett Australia served as the airliner's launch customers.

Termination and further development
During 1994, Fokker had been incurring sizable losses on its operations, which led to cuts in the output of the Fokker 50 and threatened its long term viability. During early 1995, the firm embarked upon a major restructuring programme, including efforts to renegotiate prices with its suppliers, in what was viewed by aerospace publication Flight International as a last-ditch effort to save the company in its current form. By July 1995, Fokker was in negotiations with the Dutch government over the terms for a potential bailout of the company as losses continued to mount. Fokker's owner, Daimler-Benz Aerospace AG (DASA), had agreed to provide a rescue deal for the company, but this was contingent upon Dutch government participation.

In March 1996, production of the Fokker 50 was terminated as a consequence of Fokker itself having been forced into a state of bankruptcy. The financial difficulties suffered by the firm had been in part caused by the massive cost overruns which had been incurred on both the Fokker 50 and Fokker 100, as well as due to intense competition within the regional airliner sector that Fokker had designed and marketed these aircraft towards, which had not been helped by delays to the program in the face of multiple modern competitors in the form of the Saab 340, ATR 42 and Bombardier Dash 8. Despite repeated increases cost-efficiency of production realised within the final 12 months of production, these did not prove enough to save the company.

During 1997, as a result of the company having entered into liquidation, the final Fokker 50 aircraft was delivered that year. By the end of the program, a total of 213 Fokker 50s had been completed. As early as May 1996, proposals for the partial or complete restart of production of the type were mooted, amongst these being interest from Indian aerospace firm Hindustan Aeronautics Limited in establishing a Fokker 50 assembly line in India, however these did not come about.

In 1996, Fokker Services was established; holding the type certificate for the Fokker 50, the organisation provides comprehensive support and services to operators of the type, including training, logistics support, maintenance, modification, and engineering services. By August 2006, 171 Fokker 50 aircraft remained within airline service; major operators included: Avianca (10), Denim Air (12), Skyways Express (18) and VLM Airlines (20). Some 27 other airlines including Air Astana also operated smaller numbers of the type.
Between March 2013 and September 2014, a pair of Fokker 50s were based at EHLE Lelystad airport in their Royal Netherlands Air Force livery; both aircraft had been purchased by the Peruvian Navy and were subsequently transferred.

Fokker 60

It featured a large cargo door on the right side, immediately behind the cockpit, for loading/unloading. Only four examples of the Fokker 60 were ever completed, all of which were delivered to the Royal Netherlands Air Force. All of them were part of 334 Squadron based at Eindhoven Airport. The type was typically used to transport equipment and soldiers, while it was occasionally used for paradrop operations as well.

Another 60 was under construction, but ultimately never completed due to Fokker's bankruptcy. In 2005, a pair of Fokker 60s (U-01, U-03) were converted to serve as maritime patrol aircraft as a temporary solution when it was decided to phase out the Royal Netherlands Navy P-3 Orions as a result of budget cuts. For two years, these aircraft were stationed at Hato AB Curaçao prior to their replacement in the form of civil-operated Bombardier DHC-8 aircraft in October 2007. Due to the Royal Netherlands Air Force having decided to procure two extra Lockheed C-130s, the Fokker 60s were phased out. All four Fokker 60 that were stored at Woensdrecht Air Base were sold to the Peruvian Naval Aviation, the first two planes were delivered on 8 June 2010 and the second batch of two planes were delivered at the end of 2010.

Design

The Fokker 50 is a twin turboprop-powered airliner. It was based on the earlier highly successful Fokker F27 Friendship, specifically the stretched F27-500 model. Structurally, the Fokker 50 owes much to the F27; basic construction of the fuselage, wings and empennage, which made extensive use of composite materials, hot-bonded structures and anti-corrosion treatments, remained mainly unchanged between the two aircraft apart from the strengthening of various sections where required. There were some changes made to specific areas of the aircraft, such as the wing being equipped with upturned ailerons and wingtips that effectively acted as wing endplates or winglets, it was also fitted with a larger number of smaller windows in the fuselage and a new two-wheel nose gear configuration, the latter enabling stable operations under uneven crosswind conditions.

Perhaps the most major design change from the preceding Fokker F27 was the choice of engines used for the Fokker 50. The original Rolls-Royce Dart turboprop engines that had powered various marks of the F27, which had broadly provided between 1,268 and 1715 kW (1,700-2,300 hp), were replaced by a pair of more fuel efficient Pratt & Whitney Canada PW124 powerplants, each capable of generating , which drove sets of six-bladed Dowty Rotol propellers. These slow-turning propellers, along with other measures such as vibration absorbers, eliminate the need for active noise control systems while providing an average cabin noise level of 77 dBs.

The Fokker 50, unlike the F27, was furnished with a glass cockpit which incorporated an electronic flight instrument system and an automatic flight control system, the latter being certified for conducting Cat II approaches. The flying controls include a unique single lever that is capable of controlling both engine power and actuating the variable-pitch propellers, reducing complexity and pilot workload. The cockpit also features a three-stage integrated alerting system that issues warnings to the flying crew.

Typical passenger seating arrangements range from 46 to 56 passengers, which includes overhead bins and a relatively wide central aisle. The airliner features four external doors along with integral airstairs, which enables quicker turnaround times through the faster egress and boarding of passengers and crew alike. Features such as an auxiliary power unit (APU), new generation slim seating and LED lighting in the cabin are also available as options and can be retrofitted to existing aircraft based upon customer demand.

The Fokker 50 is capable of using the majority of airports worldwide, including operations from unpaved surfaces, and has been described as possessing "first-rate short field performance" and capable of performing steep approaches to access airports such as London City Airport. The type has typically been marketed toward replacing older commuter and regional airliners in the 19-50 seat range. Although of possessing a design heavily dependent upon a previous generation of airliners, the Fokker 50 has often been highly appreciated by owners and pilots alike for its reliability, economics and flight characteristics. According to Fokker Services, the Fokker 50 possesses relatively low operational costs per trip and attributes this to its low maintenance costs, high reliability, competitive support.

Variants

Fokker 50
F27 Mark 050
Marketed as the Fokker 50 (or sometimes referred to as the Fokker 50-100), based on the F27 Mark 500 with two Pratt & Whitney Canada PW125B or PW127B turboprop engines with six-bladed propellers, updated systems and cockpit instrumentation, increased use of composite structure, double the number of windows, change from pneumatic to hydraulic systems and addition of electronic engine and propeller controls and an electronic flight instrument system (EFIS) and integrated warning system.
F27 Mark 0502
Marketed as the Fokker 50, same as the 050 with reconfigured interior layout and change in type of aft emergency exits, six built (two for the Royal Netherlands Air Force, two for the Republic of Singapore Air Force and two for Royal Brunei Air Force). MSN 20280 built 1993 was fitted with PW125B Engines and an APU.

Fokker 60
F27 Mark 0604
Marketed as the Fokker 60, same as the 0502 with an increased fuselage length ( in front of wing and  aft of wing), increased design weight and introduction of a large cargo door in the forward right side of the fuselage. Two Pratt & Whitney PW127B turboprop engines, four built.

Operators

Fokker 50 civil operators

As of August 2022, 83 Fokker 50 aircraft were in commercial service including:

Fokker 50 and 60 military and government operators
The following governments or military operators currently fly the Fokker 50 and Fokker 60 in passenger or cargo roles:

Former operators

Accidents and incidents

Accidents with fatalities
 On 15 September 1995, Malaysia Airlines Flight 2133, a Fokker 50 (9M-MGH) crashed during approach in Tawau, Sabah due to pilot error, killing 34 of 53 passengers and crew on board in the first hull loss of a Fokker 50.
 On 6 November 2002, Luxair Flight 9642, a Fokker 50 aircraft en route to Luxembourg – Findel Airport crashed and burned on final approach to the airport about six nautical miles (11 km) short of the runway while trying to land in the fog. 20 out of 22 passengers and crew perished.
 On 10 February 2004, Kish Air Flight 7170, a Fokker 50 crashed on approach to Sharjah International Airport, United Arab Emirates after both propellers reversed while causing a loss of control. All six crew and 37 of the 40 passengers on board were killed.
 On 3 March 2013, a Compagnie Africaine d'Aviation Fokker 50 registration 9Q-CBD crashed in poor weather while on approach to Goma International Airport in Goma, Democratic Republic of the Congo, killing all seven crew including Russian citizen, Alexander Bazhenov. There were three survivors.
 On 2 July 2014, a Skyward International Aviation Fokker 50 registration 5Y-CET operating a cargo flight ferrying Khat and bound for Mogadishu, Somalia crashed into Embakasi suburbs after taking-off from Jomo Kenyatta International Airport in Nairobi, Kenya. All four crew members died and the hull disintegrated and burnt partially on impact with a highrise structure.

Other incidents

 On 9 June 2002, Ethiopian Airlines Flight 113, a Fokker 50 aircraft experienced an in-flight incident a few minutes after departure on a flight to Addis Ababa, Ethiopia, when two passengers who managed to bring a model explosive and two small knives on board attempted to hijack the aircraft. Both perpetrators were shot by in-flight security personnel. During the incident, one cabin crew member was injured. The aircraft and all passengers on board arrived at the intended destination safely.
 On 14 February 2006, an SAS Commuter Fokker 50 (LN-RND) named "Inge Viking" sustained substantial damage when the main landing gear collapsed when the airplane was parked at the gate at Oslo-Gardermoen Airport, Norway. The aircraft was to carry out early morning flight SK2301 to Kristiansund, but the passengers had not boarded the flight yet.
 On 15 November 2012, a Skyward International Aviation Fokker 50 registration 5Y-CAN crashed on approach to Aweil, South Sudan after its landing gear collapsed and the aircraft left the runway immediately after landing. One passenger received minor injuries and the other 56 on board escaped unhurt. The aircraft was substantially damaged.
 On 11 October 2019, a Silverstone Air Services Fokker 50 registration 5Y-IZO operating flight 620 to Mombasa, Kenya overran the runway on takeoff from Wilson Airport in Nairobi. The aircraft was extensively damaged but there were no fatalities.
 On 25 November 2021, a Fokker 50 operated by Amapola Flyg, on its way from Helsinki Airport to Joensuu, Eastern Finland, ran into trouble immediately after taking off and had to return to the airport. No damages were reported. According the preliminary information from the authorities the plane had an engine failure.
 On 18 July 2022, a Fokker 50 registration 5Y-JXN operated by Jubba Airways, crashes on landing at Aden Adde International Airport in Somalia coming to a stop upside down at the beginning of the runway. All 36 passengers and crew safely evacuated the aircraft.

Specifications

See also

References

Sources

 Eriksson, Sören and Harm-Jan Steenhuis. The Global Commercial Aviation Industry. Routledge, 2015. .
 European Aviation Safety Agency Type-Certificate Data Sheet - Fokker F27 (TCDS A.036 Issue 2 20 May 2005)

External links

 Fokker Services
 Fokker 50 Official Page 
 Fokker 50 Systems

1980s Dutch airliners
050
Twin-turboprop tractor aircraft
High-wing aircraft
Aircraft first flown in 1985